Homalopterula heterolepis is a species of ray-finned fish in the genus Homalopterula. It can be found in northern Sumatra.

References

Balitoridae
Fish described in 1916